Ekbar Bolo Bhalobashi is a Dhallywood romantic action film that released on August 31, 2011 in Eid ul-Fitr and went on to become a box-office success in Bangladesh. The film is directed by Bodiul Alam Khokon and starring Shakib Khan and Apu Biswas. It also stars Toma Mirza, Kazi Hayath, Shiva Shanu and Misha Sowdagar in supporting roles. The film is one of the highest grossing Bangladeshi movies of 2011.

Cast
 Shakib Khan
 Apu Biswas
 Toma Mirza
 Misha Sawdagar
 Kazi Hayat
 Shaiva Shano

Soundtrack

The soundtrack of the film was composed by Ali Akram Shuvo.

Track listing

References

2011 films
2010s Bengali-language films
2010s romantic action films
Bengali-language Bangladeshi films
Bangladeshi romantic action films
Films scored by Ali Akram Shuvo